Audnedal is a former municipality in the old Vest-Agder county, Norway. It was located in the traditional district of Sørlandet. The administrative centre of the municipality was the village of Konsmo. Other villages in Audnedal include Byremo and Vivlemo. The municipality existed from 1964 until its dissolution in 2020 when Audnedal was merged into the neighboring municipality of Lyngdal in what is now Agder county.

Prior to its dissolution in 2020, the  municipality was the 302nd largest by area out of the 422 municipalities in Norway. Audnedal was the 341st most populous municipality in Norway with a population of 1,765.

General information

The old municipality of Undal was established on 1 January 1838 (see formannskapsdistrikt law). That municipality only existed until 1845 when it was split into Nord-Audnedal and Sør-Audnedal. Those municipalities were later divided also. Sør-Audnedal was divided into Spangereid in 1899 and Nord-Audnedal was divided into Konsmo and Vigmostad in 1911. During the 1960s, there were many municipal mergers across Norway due to the work of the Schei Committee. This is when the present-day municipality of Audnedal was created. Audnedal was established as a municipality on 1 January 1964 when the municipality of Konsmo (population: 712), the municipality of Grindheim (population: 701), and the Ågedal and Midtbø areas (population: 96) of Bjelland municipality were merged. This new Audnedal municipality mostly corresponded to the historical borders of the old municipality of Nord-Audnedal.

On 1 January 2020, the neighboring municipalities of Audnedal and Lyngdal merged into a new, larger municipality called Lyngdal.

Name
The municipality was named after the Audnedalen valley in which it is located. The first element is the genitive case of the river name Auðna (now Audna) and the last element is dalr which means "valley" or "dale". The river name is derived from the Norse word auðn which means "destruction" (because of flooding).

Coat of arms
The coat of arms was granted on 30 August 1991 and in use until 1 January 2020 when the municipality was dissolved. The official blazon is "Vert, a circular sawblade argent". This means the arms have a green field (background) and the charge is a circular sawblade. The sawblade has a tincture of argent which means it is commonly colored white, but if it is made out of metal, then silver is used. The green color in the field  and the sawblade was chosen to represent the importance of the timber and forestry industries in the municipality.

Churches
The Church of Norway had two parishes within the municipality of Audnedal. It is part of the Mandal prosti (deanery) in the Diocese of Agder og Telemark.

Government
All municipalities in Norway, including Audnedal, are responsible for primary education (through 10th grade), outpatient health services, senior citizen services, unemployment and other social services, zoning, economic development, and municipal roads.  The municipality was governed by a municipal council of elected representatives, which in turn elected a mayor.

Municipal council
The municipal council  of Audnedal was made up of 17 representatives that were elected to four year terms.  The party breakdown of the final municipal council was as follows:

Geography
Audnedal was an inland municipality, located in the Audnedalen valley which follows the river Audna. The municipality of Åseral bordered it to the north, Hægebostad to the west, Lyngdal and Lindesnes to the south, and Marnardal to the east. To the northeast, Audnedal bordered the municipality of Evje og Hornnes in neighboring Aust-Agder county.

Audnedal municipality had two large lakes: Ytre Øydnavatnet and Øvre Øydnavatnet. The Mandalselva river also passed through the northern part of the municipality.

Climate

Attractions
"Blomliknuten" hiking trail
Sveindal museum
Fishing for salmon in the Mandalselva river

References

External links

Municipal fact sheet from Statistics Norway 

 
Former municipalities of Norway
1964 establishments in Norway
2020 disestablishments in Norway